Vitus Eicher (born 5 November 1990) is a German professional footballer who plays as a goalkeeper for 1. FC Heidenheim in the 2. Bundesliga.

Career
On 23 April 2013, Eicher scored his first goal of his career in a Regionalliga Bayern game against TSV Buchbach.  After a blocked free kick, Eicher corralled the ball and launched it 70 meters down the field in the 58th minute.  After one bounce, the ball sailed over the opposing netminder's head giving Eicher the goal.

After the second match of the 2014–15 season, Eicher was suspended to the second squad along with his teammates Gábor Király, Daniel Adlung, Yannick Stark and captain Julian Weigl. While Király had assaulted Gary Kagelmacher during a match, the other four players had been out drinking late at night and were overheard talking negatively about the club.

Eicher was made the first-choice keeper of 1860 Munich in February 2015 after Torsten Fröhling became head coach of the team.

Career statistics

References

1990 births
Living people
German footballers
Association football goalkeepers
2. Bundesliga players
TSV 1860 Munich players
TSV 1860 Munich II players
1. FC Heidenheim players